Magda Kósáné Kovács (4 November 1940 – 27 July 2020) was a Hungarian politician who was a Member of the European Parliament (MEP) for the Hungarian Socialist Party, part of the Party of European Socialists.

She left the Socialist Party and joined Democratic Coalition founded and led by Ferenc Gyurcsány in 2011 and became head of the new party's ethical committee.

Personal life
She was married to Dr Levente Kósa. She is survived by two daughters, Judit and Eszter.

References

 Biography at the official website of the Parliament of Hungary 
 Profile at the European Parliament 

1940 births
2020 deaths
Women members of the National Assembly of Hungary
Hungarian Socialist Party MEPs
Hungarian Socialist Party politicians
Democratic Coalition (Hungary) politicians
MEPs for Hungary 2004–2009
Women MEPs for Hungary
Members of the National Assembly of Hungary (1990–1994)
Members of the National Assembly of Hungary (1994–1998)
Members of the National Assembly of Hungary (1998–2002)
Members of the National Assembly of Hungary (2002–2006)
20th-century Hungarian politicians
20th-century Hungarian women politicians
21st-century Hungarian politicians
Women government ministers of Hungary